Lynn Benesch, born Lynn Benish in Westchester, New York, aka Lynn Chester, is an American actress and singer, best known for her role as Meredith Lord on the daytime drama One Life to Live from 1969 to 1973.  In 1972 she won praise for her portrayal as a mother who had twins and one was stillborn; this led to addressing the issues around postpartum depression which was still struggling to be understood as a legitimate medical concern.    She briefly reprised the role in 1987, when her character's sister Victoria Lord, having an out of body experience, took a trip to Heaven and reunited her with deceased loved ones. As Lynn Chester her theatrical credits include "Wait Until Dark" with Shirley Jones and "Star-Spangled Girl" with Anthony Perkins as well as the television series "General Hospital".

A gifted singer and songwriter, she appeared with Skitch Henderson, and Wayland Pickard, with whom she co-wrote original songs which she performs in BBC-5's American import, radio soap opera "Milford-Haven" music episodes.<ref>Judith Robinson, "Whatever Happened To Lynn Benesch?", Soap Opera Digest, February 12, 1985.</ref> She was a kindergarten teacher before going into acting and when younger she put on shows for Vietnam vets who were confined to a VA hospital in the late 1960s and early 1970s along with a childhood friend.

Filmography
According to All Media Guide/New York Times:
 The Doctors as Bonnie Evans (March 1968)
 One Life to Live (1969-1973, 1987) - as Meredith "Merrie" LordTotal television: the comprehensive guide to programming from 1948 to the present Alex McNeil
 Comedy Tonight (1970)
 Planet of the Apes (1974)Planet of the apes: an unofficial companion David Hofstede
 Gunsmoke (1975) - as Zoe
 Happy Days (1976) - as Miss Franklin
 The Next Step Beyond (1978) (sequel series to One Step Beyond)Science fiction, horror and fantasy film and television credits Harris M. Lentz
 How the West Was Won (1978) - as Mina
 Rhoda (1978)
 The Great Brain (1978)
 Starsky and Hutch (1979) - as Candy Reese
 Hanging In (1979) - as Mona
 Hunter's Moon (1979)
 Little House on the Prairie: What Ever Happened to the Class of '56? (1980) - as Amy Phillips Sawyer
 The Sophisticated Gents (1981) - as Renee Marcus
 Command 5 (1985) - as Ann Bryan
 The Young and the Restless (1986) - as Beverly Stark
 Daytimes' Greatest Weddings'' (2004) - as Meredeth Lord Wolek

References 

Living people
American soap opera actresses
American television actresses
Actresses from New York (state)
20th-century American actresses
1940 births
21st-century American women